"Anything" is a song performed by Eric Burdon & the Animals in 1967. It was featured on their psychedelic rock album Winds of Change. While the singles "San Franciscan Nights", "Good Times" and the album were released, "Anything" was also released as a single, peaking #80 on the United States pop singles chart.  Allmusic critic Bruce Eder described it as a "relatively straightforward, brooding, moody rocker."  Billboard described the single as an "intriguing rock ballad with an equally compelling lyric."  Cash Box said it was "slow rock with a tasteful touch of soul" with "stunning string lines" and a "melancholy Burdon vocal."

The song is credited to Vic Briggs, Eric Burdon, Barry Jenkins, Danny McCulloch and John Weider. In a 2010 interview, Burdon identified it as one that he was proud of writing. He described it as a "love-generation song". He explained; "It's more than just a song about a love for your woman; it's about love for everything, from the Earth, to your friends, and even your enemies."

References

1967 singles
Songs written by Eric Burdon
The Animals songs
Song recordings produced by Tom Wilson (record producer)
MGM Records singles
1967 songs